Alexander Gennadyevich Khloponin (born March 6, 1965) is a Russian politician. Khloponin served Governor of Krasnoyarsk Krai, a krai located in Siberia, from October 2002 to January 2010. From 2010 to 2018, Khlonopin served as Deputy Prime Minister of Russia. He is a member of United Russia.

Background and education 
Khloponin was born on March 6, 1965, in Colombo, Ceylon (now Sri Lanka). He received a finance degree from the Moscow Finance Institute. He later served as chairman of the board of the Norilsk Nickel company.

Political career 
In 2001, he became the governor of Taymyr Autonomous Okrug in northern Siberia, holding that position until 2002. Khloponin won the election for governor of Krasnoyarsk Krai against Alexander Uss, another man with major business links. The race was relatively close, with Khloponin winning only 48% of the vote even in the runoff.

Russian President Dmitry Medvedev in January 2010 ordered the establishment of the North Caucasian Federal District (from Southern Federal District) and appointed Khloponin Vice-Premier of the Russian Federation and Plenipotentiary Envoy of the President to the new federal district while relieving him from the governor's office. President Vladimir Putin on May 12 replaced Khloponin as envoy with the Interior Ministry Lt. Gen. Sergey Melikov

Personal life and recognition 

In 2002, Alexander Khloponin was named Person of the Year by Expert magazine, a Russian business weekly. Khloponin's daughter, Lyubov Khloponina, studied at the London School of Economics.

References 

1965 births
Living people
Governors of Krasnoyarsk Krai
Governors of Taymyr Autonomous Okrug
People from Colombo
Financial University under the Government of the Russian Federation alumni
Russian people of Jewish descent